Whittier Mansion is an historical building at 2090 Jackson Street in San Francisco, California, US. It is listed on the National Register of Historic Places and is also a San Francisco Designated Landmark.

History 
Designed by architect Edward Robinson Swain and built in 1896 by the family of financier William Franklin Whittier, it contains 30 rooms. Construction included steel-reinforced brick walls and a facing of Arizona red sandstone.

The building was a private residency, and it later served as the German Consulate for the German Reich in 1941, during the rise of Nazi Germany, after World War II in 1950 the house was seized and sold at auction and returned to a private residency for many years, followed by the house being occupied by the California Historical Society (1956–1991). It is purported to be haunted.

References

External links

Houses in San Francisco
Houses completed in 1896
National Register of Historic Places in San Francisco
San Francisco Designated Landmarks
Reportedly haunted locations in San Francisco
Houses on the National Register of Historic Places in San Francisco